Hallmark Channel, formerly Hallmark Entertainment Network, in international markets was owned by several media companies. Over their history, the various channels were operated by Hallmark Entertainment Networks, Inc. (1995–2005), Sparrowhawk Media, Limited (2005–2007) and Universal Networks International (2007–2011). Universal Networks International rebranded or discontinued the channels by July 2011. Hallmark Entertainment Networks, Inc. was owned by Crown Media Holdings, Inc. Sparrowhawk Media was owned by venture capital companies and Universal Networks International is owned by NBCUniversal.

History

Hallmark Entertainment Network
Crown Media thus shifted directions in 1994 with the sale of the cable systems. Also that year, Hallmark Cards purchased RHI Entertainment for $365 million getting a 1,800 plus hours film library then formed Hallmark Entertainment as RHI's parent corporation. Hallmark Entertainment then formed Hallmark Entertainment Network, Inc. in mid-1995 to start the Hallmark Entertainment Network (HEN) pay TV channel in Belgium, the Netherlands and Luxembourg. The company waited to start a domestic channel due to lack of carriage space and its programming domestic rights were held by others. The Benelux channel launched in June 1995.

Hallmark Entertainment and The Jim Henson Company started a partnership in May 1998 to launch the Kermit Channel in Asia and Latin America expect to start in September 1998 with distribution handled by Hallmark Entertainment Network. The HEN channels had internationally about six million subscribers at this time.

Crown Media was reformed into Crown Media Holdings, Inc. in 2000 as part of a re-organizational plan that included the company going public. Crown Media Holdings was formed as a subsidiary of Hallmark Entertainment (Hallmark). Hallmark transferred Hallmark Entertainment Network, Inc. and its interest in the Odyssey Network into Crown Media Holdings.  While its channels had 50 million subscribers at the IPO, the company had not made a profit yet with Hallmark Entertainment Network, Inc. losing $35.5 million in 1998 on revenue of $23.7 million, and in 1999 it lost $56.7 million on revenue of $31.9 million.

EM.TV had Henson Company withdrawal from the Kermit Channel partnership with Crown Media. In November 2001, Kermit Channel Asia except for in India was shut down while Kermit blocks remained on the Asian HEN. The channel was discontinued in India in December 2001.

When Crown took control of and renamed the Odyssey Network channel to the Hallmark Channel in August 2001 with plans to quickly add original programming, the international Hallmark Entertainment Network soon did the same.

Sparrowhawk Media
In 2005, Hallmark Entertainment put the Hallmark Channels up for sale, but with disappointing offers with drew the channels from the market. The European media library rights and Hallmark Channels in international markets were sold for about $242 million in 2005 to Sparrowhawk Media, a private group backed by Providence Equity Partners and 3i and also owned by David Elstein. NBC Universal soon became the channels' major supplier.

On July 1, 2006, Sparrowhawk Media launched Movies 24 free to air film channel on Sky with Dolphin Television as the ad sales company, followed by its two-hour time shift More 24 on October 16, 2006. The company, Corus Entertainment and DIC Entertainment announced in early April 2007 for a joint venture children's TV channel, KidsCo.

NBC Universal agreed to purchased Sparrowhawk Media, international operator of Hallmark Channel, in August 2007. There were 18 Hallmark Channels at this time. The company had on its immediate schedule plans to launch KidsCo in September and Diva TV channel in the UK in October 23 with Movie24 Plus. Sparrowhawk was merged into NBCU's global networks division.

In July 2011, Universal Networks International's rights to the Hallmark Channel brand ended; the networks were either shut down, or rebranded as Diva Universal, Studio Universal, 13th Street Universal or Universal Channel.

Canadian content deal 
In October 2018, the Canadian women's entertainment channel W Network (owned by Corus Entertainment) announced that it had acquired exclusive rights to Hallmark Channel's original programming library, beginning in November for the Countdown to Christmas event. Hallmark Channel content and localised versions of its seasonal programming blocks will be aired alongside W Network's existing programming. Hallmark Channel films and series were previously acquired individually by W and other Canadian channels; much of this programming is filmed in Canada.

Hallmark Channels

Other channels

See also
 List of Hallmark Channel Original Movies

References

Defunct television channels in the Netherlands
Television channels and stations established in 1995
Television channels and stations disestablished in 2011
Defunct mass media companies